Tungsten(V) bromide is the inorganic compound with the empirical formula WBr5. The compound consists of bioctahedral structure, with two bridging bromide ligands, so its molecular formula is W2Br10.

Preparation and structure
Tungsten(V) bromide is prepared by treating tungsten powder with bromine in the temperature range 650-1000 °C. The product is often contaminated with tungsten hexabromide.

According to X-ray diffraction, the structure for tungsten pentabromide consists of an edge-shared bioctahedron.

Reactions
Tungsten(V) bromide is the precursor to other tungsten compounds by reduction reactions. For example, tungsten(IV) bromide can be prepared by reduction with aluminium or tungsten. The WBr4 can be purified by chemical vapor transport.
3 WBr5 + Al → 3 WBr4 + AlBr3
Excess tungsten pentabromide and aluminum tribromide are then removed by sublimation at 240 °C.

Tungsten(II) bromide can then be obtained heating the tetrabromide. At 450-500 °C, gaseous pentabromide is evolved leaving yellow-green residue of WBr2. An analogous method can also be applied to the synthesis of tungsten(II) chloride.

Reductive substitution reactions
Because it is relatively easy to reduce tungsten pentahalides, they can be used as alternative synthetic routes to tungsten (IV) halide adducts. For example, reaction of WBr5 with pyridine gives WBr4(py)2.
2 WBr5 + 7 C5H5N → 2 WBr4(C5H5N)2 + bipyridine + C5H5NHBr

References

Bromides
Tungsten halides